JIT or Jit may refer to:
 Just-in-time compilation
 Just-in-time manufacturing
 Jhulelal Institute of Technology, Nagpur University, India
 Joint investigation team, investigating cross-border crime 
 Jit, a style of Zimbabwean dance music
 Jit (film), a 1990 Zimbabwean film
 Jit, Qalqilya, a Palestinian town in the West Bank

See also
 Just in Time (disambiguation)